Mohammad Yusuf Shah, commonly known as Syed Salahuddin, is the head of Hizbul Mujahideen, a separatist organization operating in Kashmir. He also heads the United Jihad Council, a Pakistan-based conglomeration of jihadist militant groups sponsored by the ISI, with the goal of merging Jammu and Kashmir with Pakistan.

Salahuddin vowed to block any peaceful resolution to the Kashmir conflict, threatened to train more Kashmiri suicide bombers, and vowed to turn the Kashmir valley "into a graveyard for Indian forces." He is listed on the Most Wanted List of India's National Investigation Agency. He is named as a Specially Designated Global Terrorist by the US Department Of State. Salahuddin dismissed the listing as "a joint move by the US, Israel, and India to express their animosity towards Pakistan." Pakistan also dismissed sanction against him. In May 2020, an attack on him was called a warning by Pakistani intelligence.

In August 2020 India's Enforcement Directorate filed a charge-sheet. A court in New Delhi issued a summons in 2021 in relation to a terror funding case. In 2022, India's NIA court ordered charges to be framed against him and others.

Early life
Syed Mohammad Yusuf Shah was born in December 1946 in Soibugh, Budgam, a village in the Kashmir Valley. His maternal grandfather Gulla Saheb was a well-known spiritual figure. His father was a farmer.

Yusuf Shah studied under his grandfather's guidance, who took an interest in his education. In high school, Shah composed poetry in English and became an impressive debater. He finished Intermediate in science with first-class marks. Then he studied arts at the Sri Pratap College, Srinagar and Masters in Political Science  at the University of Kashmir, receiving his degree in 1971. Later he became an Islamic teacher at a madrasa.

Jamaat-e-Islami 
A year after his graduation, Yusuf Shah was appointed as the tehsil chief of Jamaat-e-Islami Kashmir for Budgam. Later he became the chief Nizam-e-Aala for the Jamaat-e-Islami's student wing, Tehreek-e-Talaba. In 1986, he was appointed the district chief of Jamaat for the Srinagar district. According to a biography in the Hindustan Times, he was a notable Islamic scholar and preacher.
His Friday sermons at the Exhibition Grounds in Srinagar were popular with the  youth. His sermons were contemporary and  "had the power to articular what was in our minds", according to Showkat Ahmad Bakhshi of the Islamic Students League.

In 1987, Yusuf Shah contested the J&K assembly election as a candidate of the  Muslim United Front, in Srinagar's Amira Kadal constituency. The Islamic Students League campaigned for him and provided the "street power" to counter the cadres of the National Conference. Yasin Malik served as his campaign manager and Ajaz Dar, who had a licensed gun, served as his unofficial bodyguard.
There is consensus among the scholars that the election was 'stolen' and 
Ghulam Mohiuddin Shah of the National Conference was declared as the winner despite Yusuf Shah having had the lead.
Yusuf Shah as well as Yasin Malik, along with other supporters, were arrested and put in jail without trial.

Hizbul Mujahideen
After his arrest for violent protests and release in 1989, he then joined Hizbul Mujahideen founded by Muhammad Ahsan Dar alias "Master"  who later parted from Hizbul Mujahideen. He soon took over as the chief of Hizbul Mujahideen and then adopted nom de guerre "Syed Salahuddin", named after Saladin, the 12th century Muslim political and military leader, who fought in the Crusades.

In June 2012 in an interview, Hizb-ul-Mujahideen chief Syed Salahuddin accepted that Pakistan had been backing Hizb-ul-Mujahideen for fight in Kashmir. He had declared to start attacking Pakistan if it ceased support of jihadis in Jammu and Kashmir, as they were fighting "Pakistan's war".

Designation as a terrorist by U.S. 
On 26 June 2017 the US Department of State has designated Mohammad Yusuf Shah, also known as Syed Salahuddin, as a Specially Designated Global Terrorist (SDGT) under Section 1(b) of Executive Order (E.O.) 13224, which imposes sanctions on foreign persons who have committed, or pose a significant risk of committing, acts of terrorism that threaten the security of U.S. nationals or the national security, foreign policy, or economy of the United States. As a consequence of this designation, U.S. persons are generally prohibited from engaging in transactions with Salahuddin and all of Salahuddin's property and interests in property subject to United States jurisdiction are blocked. He is designated as an Indian national with a date of birth of 1952 and addresses in Muzaffarabad (the capital of Azad Kashmir, Pakistan), Rawalpindi (the Pakistan military headquarters) and Islamabad.

Pakistan rejected the US sanctions against him.

Family 
Shah is married, with five sons and two daughters.

Two sons were removed from government offices in Jammu and Kashmir in 2021. In the next month one of his sons, Syed Shakeel Yousuf, in a terror funding case. Shahid, another son, had been arrested before.

See also
 Kashmir conflict
 Islamic terrorism
 Islamic extremism
 Pakistan and state-sponsored terrorism
 Terrorism in India 
 List of terrorist incidents in India

References

Bibliography

Further reading
 Most Wanted Profiles of Terror by K.P.S Gill,

External links
 Who is Syed Salahuddin, chief of Hizbul Mujahideen?, Indian Express, 30 June 2017.
 Interview with rediff.com, dated 27 August 2001
 Interview with rediff.com, dated 9 January 2007
 Terror in twilight, dated 26 August – 8 September 2006

1946 births
Fugitives wanted by India
Fugitives wanted on terrorism charges
Indian expatriates in Pakistan
Indian Islamists
Living people
Kashmiri militants
People from Budgam district
University of Kashmir alumni
Indian people imprisoned on charges of terrorism
People charged with terrorism
Specially Designated Nationals and Blocked Persons List
Individuals designated as terrorists by the United States government
Leaders of Islamic terror groups